Lee Gyeong-seop (born 1922) was a South Korean weightlifter. He competed in the men's featherweight event at the 1956 Summer Olympics.

References

External links
  

1922 births
Possibly living people
South Korean male weightlifters
Olympic weightlifters of South Korea
Weightlifters at the 1956 Summer Olympics
Place of birth missing
20th-century South Korean people